The Juno Award for "Reggae Recording of the Year" has been awarded since 1985, as recognition each year for the best reggae album or single in Canada.

The award was not presented in 1992 or 1993, during which time reggae albums were subsumed into the new World Beat Recording category, but a separate reggae category was reinstituted in 1994 and has been presented continuously since then.

Best Reggae/Calypso Recording (1985 - 1991)

Best Reggae Recording (1994 - 2002)

Reggae Recording of the Year (2003 - Present)

References

Reggae Recording